Francisco "Pacho" Rodríguez Maldonado (born 5 June 1960) is a Colombian former professional racing cyclist. He rode in four editions of the Tour de France and five editions of the Vuelta a España.

Major results

1981
 1st Stages 7 & 8 Vuelta a Colombia
1983
 1st Stage 13 Vuelta a Colombia
 1st Stage 4 Clásico RCN
1984
 1st Stages 3 & 5 Critérium du Dauphiné Libéré
 2nd Overall Clásico RCN
1st Stages 3 & 6
 2nd Overall Vuelta a Colombia
1st Stage 12
1985
 1st  Overall Clásico RCN
1st Stage 5
 3rd Overall Vuelta a España
1st Stages 11 & 12
 5th Overall Volta a Catalunya
 7th Overall Vuelta a Murcia
 8th Overall Setmana Catalana de Ciclisme
1987
 1st Stage 21 Vuelta a España
1989
 1st  Overall Clásica de Cundinamarca
1990
 1st  Overall Vuelta a Boyacá
 1st  Overall Clásica de Cundinamarca
 3rd Overall Vuelta a Colombia
1st Stages 8 & 13

References

External links
 

1960 births
Living people
Colombian male cyclists
Sportspeople from Boyacá Department
Colombian Vuelta a España stage winners
20th-century Colombian people